The Proserpine River is a river in Whitsunday Region of Queensland, Australia.

Course
The headwaters of the river rise below Mount Quandong in the Great Dividing Range and initially flow northwards while being fed by numerous creeks running from the Clarke Range to the west and the Normanby Range to the south. The river enters Lake Proserpine then exits in an easterly direction and flowing past to the south of Foxdale, then to the north of Proserpine. It continues east crossing the Bruce Highway then veers south through Melaleuca forests and discharges through estuarine wetlands and mangrove ecosystems into Repulse Bay near Conway Beach and then onto the Coral Sea.

Catchment
The area is predominantly used for grazing cattle with extensive areas also used for sugar cane production. 

The estuary functions as a result of river energy with a tide dominated delta. It is in a modified condition as a result of agriculture.

History
The traditional owners of the area are the Gia and Ngaro peoples, who have inhabited the area for thousands of years.

The name of the Proserpine first appeared in 1861 when the Emmerson family acquired the lease for a cattle station which they are thought to have named the Proserpine Creek Run near the river mouth. It is generally believed that the explorer George Dalrymple named the river although it is likely that he would never have traversed the river. The name of the river is an anglicised version of the Roman Proserpina, a goddess of fertility. 

The Proserpine was rated as the river in Queensland where people were most likely to see a saltwater crocodile from 2000 to 2012, with 151 sightings recorded over the period. In 2015 a nest of up to 30 baby crocodiles were thought to have been stolen from the river, despite crocodiles being a protected species in Queensland. According to a survey conducted from 2016 to 2019, the Proserpine River had the highest density of crocodiles in Queensland, with 5.5 per kilometre (3.4 per mile).

See also

References

Rivers of Queensland
Whitsunday Region